A container is any receptacle or enclosure for holding a product used in storage, packaging, and transportation, including shipping.
Things kept inside of a container are protected on several sides by being inside of its structure. The term is most frequently applied to devices made from materials that are durable and are often partly or completely rigid.

A container can also be considered as a basic tool, consisting of any device creating a partially or fully enclosed space that can be used to contain, store, and transport objects or materials.

History 
Humans have used containers for at least 100,000 years, and possibly for millions of years. The first containers were probably invented for storing food, allowing early humans to preserve more of their food for a longer time, to carry it more easily, and also to protect it from other animals. The development of food storage containers was "of immense importance to the evolving human populations", and "was a totally innovative behavior" not seen in other primates. The earliest containers were probably objects found in nature such as hollow gourds, of which primitive examples have been found in cultures such as those of the Tharu people, and native Hawaiian people. These were followed by woven baskets, carved wood, and pottery.

Containers thereafter continued to develop along with related advances in human technology, and with the development of new materials and new means of manufacture. Early glass bottles were produced by the Phoenicians; specimens of Phoenician translucent and transparent glass bottles have been found in Cyprus and Rhodes generally varying in length from three to six inches. These Phoenician examples from the first millennium BC were thought to have been used to contain perfume. The Romans learned glass-making from the Phoenicians and produced many extant examples of fine glass bottles, mostly relatively small. By the beginning of the eighteenth century, sizes for retail containers such as glass bottles had become standardized for their markets.

In 1810, Frenchman Philippe de Girard came to London and used British merchant Peter Durand as an agent to patent his own idea for a process for making tin cans.  The canning concept was based on experimental food preservation work in glass containers the year before by the French inventor Nicholas Appert. Durand did not pursue food canning, but, in 1812, sold his patent to two Englishmen, Bryan Donkin and John Hall, who refined the process and product, and set up the world's first commercial canning factory on Southwark Park Road, London.  By 1813 they were producing their first tin canned goods for the Royal Navy.

For transportation of goods on a larger scale, larger containers remained a problem, as customs officials inspecting imports had to deal with a lack of standardization in this field, and because predominantly wooden containers in use well into the twentieth century were prone to leaking or breaking. The standardized steel shipping container was developed in the 1950s, and quickly became ubiquitous for the large-scale transportation of commercial goods.

Towards the end of the Twentieth century, the introduction of computer-aided design made it possible to design highly specialized containers and container arrangements, and also to make form-fitting labels for containers of unusual shapes.

Modern characteristics 
A number of considerations go into the design of modern containers:

Variety 
Practical examples of containers are listed below.

 Ceramic cylindrical vessels including:
 Ancient vessels, including Amphoras, Kvevri, Pithos, and Dolium
 Bottles, similar to a jar in being traditionally symmetrical about the axis perpendicular to its base and made of glass
 Jars, traditionally cylindrical and made of glass
 Cylindrical vessels including:
 Barrels, made of wooden staves bound by rope, wooden or metal hoops. 
 Cans, traditionally cylindrical and sheet-metallic.
 Drums, similar to a can but definitely cylindrical and not necessarily metallic
 Tub
 Rectilinear vessels including:
 Boxes
 Crates, a box or rectilinear exoskeleton, designed for hoisting or loading
 Wooden boxes
 Lift-vans
 Corf
 Certain waste containers
 Flexible containers including:
 Bags, such as shopping bags, mail bags, sick bag
 Luggage, including satchels, backpacks, and briefcases
 Packets
 Gunny sacks, flour sacks
 Wallets
 Shipping containers, including:
 Corrugated boxes, made of corrugated fiberboard
 Intermodal containers, a.k.a. ship container or cargo container
 Twenty-foot equivalent units, an industry standard intermodal container size
 Intermediate bulk containers
 Unit load devices, similar to a crate
 Flexible intermediate bulk containers

References

Sources 
 Yam, K.L., "Encyclopedia of Packaging Technology", John Wiley & Sons, 2009,

External links 
 
 

 
Food packaging
Packaging